Oghulchak Arslan Khan (9th century) was the last Karakhanid ruler to follow the native Turkic religion of Tengrism. He was a lesser Bughra Khan during his elder brother Bazir Arslan's rule in the west. He was titled Arslan Khan after his ascension to the throne.

Reign 
He may have clashed with the Samanid emir Ismail in Talas, 893. After withdrawing to Kashgar, he welcomed the influx of Muslim traders to the city, even allowing them to build a mosque in the town of Artux just outside Kashgar. Growing Muslim presence led to the secret conversion of his nephew, Satuq Bughra Khan. When Oghulchak heard that Satuq had become a Muslim, he demanded that Satuq build a Tengriist temple to show that he hadn't converted. Nasr, the Persian merchant who converted Satuq to Islam, advised him that he should pretend to build a temple but with the intention of building a mosque in his heart. The khagan, after seeing Satuq starting to build the temple, stopped him, believing that he had not converted. Afterwards, Satuq obtained a fatwa which permitted him in effect to kill his uncle, after which he conquered Kashgar.

References 

9th-century Turkic people
Turkic rulers